The 2019 Women's Beach handball at the World Beach Games will be the first edition of the tournament, held at Doha, Qatar from 11 to 16 October 2019.

Qualification

Draw
The draw was held on 27 August 2019 at Doha, Qatar.

Preliminary round
All times are local (UTC+3).

Group A

Group B

Knockout stage

Championship bracket

5–8th place bracket

9–12th place bracket

Final ranking

References

External links
Official website
Results
IHF website

2019 World Beach Games events
2019 in women's handball